The Council on Environmental Quality (CEQ) is a division of the Executive Office of the President that coordinates federal environmental efforts in the United States and works closely with agencies and other White House offices on the development of environmental and energy policies and initiatives.

The first Chair of the Council on Environmental Quality was Russell E. Train, under President Richard Nixon. Since April 14, 2021, the chair is Brenda Mallory.

Mission
The CEQ produces an annual report for the president on the state of the environment, oversees federal agency implementation of environmental impact assessments, and acts as a referee when agencies disagree over the adequacy of such assessments. The National Environmental Policy Act tasks CEQ with ensuring that federal agencies meet their obligations under the Act, granting the body a significant role in environmental protection. Through inter-agency working groups and coordination with other EOP bodies, CEQ also works to advance the president's agenda on the environment, natural resources, and energy.

History

Origins
The United States Congress established the CEQ within the Executive Office of the President as part of the National Environmental Policy Act of 1969 (NEPA), during the Richard Nixon administration. The CEQ was assigned additional responsibilities by the Environmental Quality Improvement Act of 1970. In enacting NEPA, Congress recognized that nearly all federal activities affect the environment in some way, and mandated that federal agencies must consider the environmental effects of their actions during their planning and decision-making processes.  Under NEPA, CEQ works to balance environmental, economic, and social objectives in pursuit of NEPA's goal of "productive harmony" between humans and their environment.

Clinton administration
President Bill Clinton appointed Kathleen McGinty and then George T. Frampton Jr. to chair the agency.

George W. Bush administration
President George W. Bush's CEQ chairman was James L. Connaughton, serving from 2001 to 2009. He was formerly a partner at the law firm Sidley Austin LLP, where he lobbied to reduce government regulation on behalf of clients including the Aluminum Company of America and the Chemical Manufacturers Association of America.

During the Bush administration, there were concerns over links between CEQ staffers and the industries it oversaw. BBC Environment Analyst Roger Harrabin described it as "a hard-line group of advisers with close links to the U.S. oil industry." One CEQ chief of staff under President Bush, Philip Cooney, was previously a lobbyist employed by the American Petroleum Institute. In June 2005, The New York Times published an internal CEQ memo provided by federal whistleblower Rick Piltz. The memo showed Cooney had repeatedly edited government climate reports in order to play down links between emissions and global warming. Cooney, who claimed he had been planning to resign for two years, resigned two days after the scandal broke "to spend more time with his family." Immediately after resigning, Cooney went to work for ExxonMobil in their public affairs department. In 2005 Piltz created a watchdog organization Climate Science Watch, a program of the Government Accountability Project.

Obama administration
Under President Barack Obama, Nancy Sutley served as Chair of the Council on Environmental Quality from January 2009 until February 2014. Following Sutley's departure, Michael Boots served as acting head of the Council until March 2015. Christy Goldfuss was appointed to succeed Boots, and served in the same capacity, as "managing director", until the end of Obama's term, in January 2017.

Trump administration
In October 2017, President Donald Trump nominated Kathleen Hartnett White, former chair of the Texas Commission on Environmental Quality, to be chair of CEQ. However, her nomination was withdrawn in February 2018 as she did not garner enough support in the Senate. CEQ chief of staff and acting head Mary Neumayr was nominated and considered in summer 2018 as chair. She was confirmed in January 2019.

Biden administration
In December 2020, President Biden announced the selection of Brenda Mallory as the next Chair of the CEQ. On March 24, 2021, the U.S. Senate Environment and Public Works committee voted 11-9 to approve her appointment. Mallory has prior experience with CEQ under the Obama Administration, having been the general counsel. At the time of her nomination, Mallory was the director of regulatory policy at the Southern Environmental Law Center, an advocacy and litigation group.  On April 14, 2021, Mallory was confirmed as the leader of the White House Council on Environmental Quality (CEQ) by a 53-45 vote in the United States Senate. She is the first African American chair of the CEQ. 
Mallory took part in the virtual 2021 Leaders' Climate Summit.

Chair

The Chair of the Council on Environmental Quality serves as the principal environmental policy adviser to the US President.  In addition, CEQ reports annually to the President on the state of the environment; oversees federal agency implementation of the environmental impact assessment process; and acts as a referee when agencies disagree over the adequacy of such assessments.  The Council coordinates federal environmental efforts and works closely with agencies and other White House offices in the development of environmental policies and initiatives.

See also
Executive Office of the President of the United States
The Global 2000 Report to the President

References

External links

Council on Environmental Quality
Proposed and finalized federal regulations from the Council on Environmental Quality

Environmental law in the United States
Environmental policy in the United States
Executive Office of the President of the United States
George W. Bush administration controversies
1969 in the environment
1969 establishments in the United States
Government agencies established in 1969